A national brand is the brand of a product that is distributed nationally under a brand name owned by a producer or distributor as opposed to local brands distributed only in some areas of a country and to private labels that carry a brand owned by the retailer rather than the producer.

Marketing and advertising may give consumers the impression that a national-brand product is superior to a local or private-labeled product. Both types use an advertising tactic involving giving away promotional products. Entrepreneur Magazine explains more concisely, "physical gifts with your advertising on it such as balloons, smartphone wipes, key chains, fridge magnets, pens and notepads are always popular too."

References

 According to Kotler: The World's Foremost Authority on Marketing Answers Your Questions / Philip Kotler, 2005
 Retail Price Cutting and Its Control by Manufacturers / Albert Haring, 1976
 National Brand and Store Brand Price Competition: Who Hurts Whom? / Raj Sethuraman, 1995
 Dunn, Chris W. (2016-12-13). "8 Powerful Ways to Market Your Business on a Limited Budget". Entrepreneur. Retrieved 2019-06-07.

Branding terminology
Brand management
Brands by country
Types of branding